Montgomery Hill Baptist Church is a historic church on the east side of Highway 59 on CR 80 in Tensaw, Alabama.  It was built in 1853 in a Greek Revival style. The building was added to the National Register of Historic Places in 1988.

References

Baptist churches in Alabama
Churches on the National Register of Historic Places in Alabama
National Register of Historic Places in Baldwin County, Alabama
Greek Revival church buildings in Alabama
Churches completed in 1853
Churches in Baldwin County, Alabama